Haydaze is an Australian children's television series that first screened on the Ten Network in 1990. The thirteen part series follows the lives of the Carmichael family, an old family of pioneering stock, who clash with the city bred Simmons family, who buy the neighbouring farm to get "back to basics".

Haydaze was produced by Paul Barron, directed by Paul Moloney and David Rapsey and written by Glenda Hambly, David Rapsey and John Rapsey.

Cast
 Bartholomew John as John Carmichael
 Darren Kelly as Mark Carmichael
 Annie Murtagh-Monks as Annie Carmichael
 Shannon Armstrong as Linda Carmichael
 Brayden West as Sean Carmichael
 Robert Van Mackelenberg as Perry Simmons
 Vivienne Garrett as Jill Simmons
 Denise Vose as Rebecca Simmons

International
The series was shown in Germany as Rebecca und die Jungen von nebenan (Rebecca and the boys next door).

See also 
 List of Australian television series

References

External links
 Haydaze at the Australian Television Information Archive
 Haydaze at Screen Australia

Network 10 original programming
Australian children's television series
1990 Australian television series debuts
1990 Australian television series endings
English-language television shows